Rudolf Huber (born 20 February 1963) is a former Austrian alpine skier.

Career
During his career he has achieved 6 results among the top 10 in the World Cup.

World Cup results
Top 10

References

External links
 
 

1963 births
Living people
Austrian male alpine skiers
20th-century Austrian people